Federico Perez Ponsa (born 22 October 1993 in Buenos Aires) is a chess player who received the FIDE title of Grandmaster (GM) in 2011.

Chess career 
In July 2007, he became the U14 Pan American Champion in Medellín, Colombia, achieving the title of FIDE Master. 

In March 2009, he got his last International Master norm, in the ITT Sub 20 Projection, held at GEBA. 
In May of the same year, he qualified for the first time in the Superior Argentine Championship (84th), played in La Plata, at the age of 15.  In May 2011, he became the U20 South American Champion in Tarija , Bolivia. 

Perez Ponsa became a Grandmaster in 2011, at the Grafica Yael tournament, at the age of 17.

In July 2014, at the 89th Argentine Superior Championship, he tied for first place and lost the tiebreaks against Rubén Felgaer.
In December, he got 1st place with in the San Luis International Open. 

In May 2015, he qualified in the Continental of the Americas and played in the Chess World Cup in September 2015. He tied 1-1 against GM Leinier Domínguez and was eliminated in the tiebreaks. In November, he won the II Magistral Aloas organized at the Palacio de las Aguas Corrientes. 
In August 2016, he won the Magistral Copa Mercosur at Villa Martelli. 

In September 2017, he became the Metropolitan Champion at Club Torre Blanca. 
In October of that year, he is Superior Argentine Runner-up, in the 92nd Argentine Championship held in Morón. 

In April 2018, he won the Legislatura Cup played in the Buenos Aires Legislature. 
In November, he got 1st place in the 25th Pro-AM Clarín Cup Open at Villa Martelli 

On the February 1, 2019 list, he enters the FIDE Top 100 in both Blitz (2,646) and Rapid (2,655).
In August 2019, he got 1st place in the Mercosur Master Cup, at Villa Martelli. 

In May 2021, he qualified in the Hybrid Continental of the Americas and participated for the second time in the Chess World Cup in July 2021. This time, he tied 1-1 in the first round against GM  Momchil Nikolov beating him on tiebreaks. In the second round, he lost 1.5-0.5 to GM Alexander Grischuk.
In November 2021, he won the 28th Open Pro-AM Copa Clarín at Villa Martelli. 

In June 2022, in the 96th Argentine Championship held at the Club Argentino de Ajedrez, he tied for first place and became Superior Argentine Champion, beating GM Leonardo Tristán and Ariel Sorín in a triangular tiebreaker. 

In October 2022, he played in the XII South American Games Asuncion 2022 and won 3 medals. In the individual competitions, he won the Bronze medal in Rapids. In the mixed competitions, he won a Silver medal in Blitz and a Gold medal in Rapid together with Claudia Amura.

Olympiads
He represented Argentina in four Chess Olympiads

Argentinian Championships

Awards 

Premio Revelación Clarín (2009)

Premio Podio al Mejor Deportista de Zárate (2009 y 2011)

Premio Olimpia de Plata (2011) 

Premio Jorge Newbery (2015).

In 2020 he was recognized with the Konex Award - Diploma of Merit as one of the 5 best Argentine chess players of the last decade.

Other activities 

Federico Perez Ponsa is a semi-professional Age of Empires II player under nickname Fedex. He was, among others, the member of Argentina B at the 2020 2v2 Age of Empires II World Cup.

References

External links 
 Profile FIDE ID
 Profile Chess.com profile
 Profile Lichess.org profile
 Games Perez Ponsa games at argedrez.com.ar

1993 births
Living people
Argentine chess players
Chess grandmasters
People from Buenos Aires